Teófilo Borunda Ortiz (Satevó, Chihuahua, February 4, 1912 – March 18, 2001, Ciudad Juárez) was a Mexican politician, member of the Institutional Revolutionary Party, Governor of Chihuahua from 1956 to 1962, and was a senator and federal deputy.

The first public office that was chosen was that of municipal president of Juárez, from 1940 to 1941; he was also the founder of the National Confederation of Popular Organizations (CNOP) of the PRI in Ciudad Juarez at that time. Borunda served as federal deputy to the XXXIX legislature from 1943 to 1946; that same year he was designated as secretary general for Rodolfo Sánchez Taboada and then again served as federal deputy to the XLI legislature from 1949 to 1952. He was the President of the Chamber of Deputies in 1951. In 1952 he was chosen to represent the state of Chihuahua as a senator for until 1958, and was president of the senate during this time.

Before finishing his term as senator, in 1956 he was nominated by PRI then he was elected as governor of Chihuahua until 1962, during his government the railroad Chihuahua to Pacific was finished  and he completed the channeling of the Río Chuviscar in its section that crosses the city of Chihuahua.

After he finished his governorship period he was named Manager of the COVE and subsequently Ambassador of Mexico in Argentina.

See also 
 1956 Chihuahua state election

References

1912 births
2001 deaths
Governors of Chihuahua (state)
Ambassadors of Mexico to Argentina
Presidents of the Chamber of Deputies (Mexico)
Members of the Chamber of Deputies (Mexico)
Members of the Senate of the Republic (Mexico)
Presidents of the Senate of the Republic (Mexico)
Municipal presidents of Juárez
Institutional Revolutionary Party politicians
Politicians from Chihuahua (state)
20th-century Mexican politicians